The United Nations Educational, Scientific and Cultural Organization (UNESCO) World Heritage Sites are places of importance to cultural or natural heritage as described in the UNESCO World Heritage Convention, established in 1972. Below is the list and the tentative list of sites in Kyrgyzstan. (For the criteria see the Selection criteria)

List of properties inscribed on the World Heritage List

List of properties in the tentative list

References and notes 

Kyrgyzstan geography-related lists
Kyrgyzstan
 
Lists of tourist attractions in Kyrgyzstan